Henry John Hefty (December 28, 1858August 20, 1915) was an immigrant from Switzerland who worked as an architect based in Portland, Oregon, United States.

Early life
Hefty was born Heinrich Hefti in 1858 in Schwanden, in the Swiss canton of Glarus. His father was an architect and building contractor who taught his son the principles of architecture and construction. Hefty continued his study of architecture at the Darmstadt Technical School, graduating in 1879. He immigrated to the United States in 1881, following his brother to Portland, Oregon.

He later adopted the anglicised spelling of his name.

Career
Hefty began working in Portland as a building contractor, and he employed over twenty workers. Beginning in 1884, he focused entirely on architecture, designing in a variety of styles and usually incorporating at least one tower in his designs.

Most of Hefty's work is preserved only in photographs and engravings, although a few buildings remain. He designed Portland's First Congregational Church at SW Park and Madison Street, and he supervised its construction between 1889 and 1895. In 1904 Hefty designed the Eaton Hotel at SW 9th and Morrison. One of his last projects was the Buckingham Hotel in 1911, also known as the Kingston Apartments, at the intersection of West Burnside, Southwest Morrison, and Southwest 20th Place.

City Hall
One of Hefty's designs that was never completed was Portland City Hall. In 1890 Hefty won a design competition to build a new city hall. His design was massive, and its construction required a major amount of stone, iron, and brick over a two-year period at a cost of $500,000. Hefty's compensation for the project as approved by the city was $20,000. After the building's foundation was completed, the city council stopped construction, citing cost overruns. The council awarded a new contract to architects Whidden & Lewis to design a less costly, more modest building. Biographer Harvey K. Hines classified the change of architects as "political dodgery."

In 1915 Hefty died suddenly during a vacation in Switzerland. At the time, his estate was valued at $70,000.

Partial list of buildings
 St. Helens Hall
 Hotel Vendome
 Washington Block
 Coleman Flats
 First Congregational Church
 Buckingham Hotel
 Eaton Building
 Richard B. Knapp House

See also
 Architecture of Portland, Oregon
 History of Portland, Oregon

Further reading
 Thomas Vaughan and George A. McMath, A Century of Portland Architecture (Oregon Historical Society, 1967)
 E. Kimbark MacColl and Harry H. Stein, Merchants, Money, and Power: The Portland Establishment, 1843–1913 (Georgian Press, 1988)
 Richard Ellison Ritz, Architects of Oregon (Lair Hill, 2003)

References

External links

 Image of the Henry J. Hefty House
 Henry J. Hefty Architectural Papers
 

1858 births
1915 deaths
19th-century American architects
20th-century American architects
Architects from Portland, Oregon
Swiss architects
Swiss emigrants to the United States
Technische Universität Darmstadt alumni